Kikis may refer to:

Kikis Kazamias (born 1951), Cypriot economist and politician; former Minister of Finance
Thoma Kikis, American film producer and designer
Sang Mokteng Kikis, 14th century ruler of the Sunda Kingdom in western Java

See also
Kiki (disambiguation)